Christoffer Boe (born 1974) is a Danish film director and screenwriter.  He is an established and well-known not only in Denmark, but all through the world. Among his international awards there are FIPRESCI Director of the Year at San Sebastián International Film Festival and Golden Camera at Cannes Film Festival in 2003. He is also co-founder and director of the film production company AlphaVille Pictures Copenhagen.

Early life and education 
Boe was born in Rungsted just north of Copenhagen, Denmark. After school in Denmark, he went to study the history of cinematography in Indiana University in Bloomington, United States. Then, he continued his studies in Copenhagen University. In 1997 he decided to go deep into movie making and was accepted at the National Film School of Denmark director's course.

During that time he directed a trilogy of short films: Obsession (1999), Virginity (2000) and Anxiety (2001). They were 20 to 30 minutes long and starred Maria Bonnevie and Nikolaj Lie Kaas. They're all basically about a young male being obsessed by a beautiful woman and then being trapped in his own logic of what love is. "Anxiety" received the Prix Decouverte de la Critique Francais and was screened in Critic's Week in 2002.

At that point Boe developed a style of movie making and playing with narrative structure. He graduated from the National Film School of Denmark in 2001.

Career 
After the graduation he is the head of so-called "Hr. Boe & Co." team. In spite of the fact that their debut was even during studying (Anxiety in 2001), their first feature film Reconstruction released in 2003 has become their first actual collaborative work.
He was so satisfied with Maria Bonnevie and Nikolaj Lie Kaas playing in his students shorts – so he wrote Reconstruction specifically with them in mind.
This real debut was well received by critics on international film festivals.

In 2001 he made 6 episodes (each 10 minutes) of TV series Kissmeyer Basics.

In 2004 he shot a short film Europe Does Not Exist as part of Visions of Europe with Cecilie Thomsen and Henning Moritzen representing Demark in this Europe Union media project.

His fourth feature film – thriller Everything will be Fine was selected for Quinzaine des Réalisateurs (Directors' Fortnight), marking the third Danish film to be selected for 2010 Cannes International Film Festival.

Hr. Boe & Co. 
Boe is the head of so-called Hr. Boe & Co. consisting of a group of filmmakers who gathered together because of a mutual adoration for the perfect frame while studying at the National Film School.

The other basic members are:
 Tine Grew Pfeiffer (film producer)
 Manuel Alberto Claro (director of photography)
 Mikkel E.G. Nielsen (film editor)
 Morten Green (sound designer)

Reconstruction is Hr. Boe & Co.'s feature film début.

Trivia 
 His production company is named after the film Alphaville and he is an atheist.
 Christoffer about Lars Von Trier: "I think there are ten or twenty guys like him, who you just have to look at. He is one of those. I find his position as a very confrontational and controversial man kind of funny. To me he's not controversial figure, he's just a very interesting film maker".

Filmography

Short films (student works) 
 Obsession (1999)
 Virginity (2000)
 Anxiety (2001)

Feature films 
 Reconstruction (2003)
 Allegro (2005)
 Offscreen (2006)
 Everything will be Fine (2010)
 Beast (2010)
 Sex, Drugs & Taxation (2013)
 A Taste of Hunger (2021)

Other 
 Kissmeyer Basic (2001 TV series)
 Visions of Europe (2004, segment "Europe Does Not Exist")

Awards 
 2003 San Sebastián Film Festival FIPRESCI Director of the Year
 2003 Caméra d'Or for Reconstruction
 2006 Young Cinema Award at the Venice Film Festival for Offscreen
 2006 Altre Visioni Award at the 63rd Venice International Film Festival for Offscreen
 2006 win at The Nordic Council Film Prize for Offscreen
 2012 Dauphin d'Or at Cannes Corporate Media & TV Awards for "We are Maersk"
 2015 Dauphin d'Argent at Cannes Corporate Media & TV Awards for "Danfoss Engineering Tomorrow"

Quotes on filmmaking 

 "I liked movies so much that they became an obsession. I am still trying to kick the habit."
 "Making it good, which is tougher than one might think. Creating rules and an inner logic in a cinematic world where everything is possible is not easy. Or maybe it is, but it wasn't for me."

References

External links 

 
 

1974 births
Danish film directors
Directors of Caméra d'Or winners
Living people
Danish male screenwriters
People from Hørsholm Municipality